The Future Hope Alliance was a conservative political party in South Korea.  Assembly members who supported Park Geun-hye in her failed bid for the Grand National Party (GNP) nomination for 2007 presidential election, initially called the Pro-Park Alliance (친박연대, 親朴連帶; Chinbak Yeondae), established the new party on March 21, 2008.

On April 2, 2010, the party announced that it would rejoin the GNP. On February 2, 2012, the party dissolved and merged into the GNP, which was then renamed the Saenuri Party.

Electoral results

Legislature

Local

Gallery

Notes

References

2008 establishments in South Korea
2012 disestablishments in South Korea
Conservative parties in South Korea
Defunct political parties in South Korea
Liberty Korea Party
Political parties disestablished in 2012
Political parties established in 2008